Moshonki is a rural locality (a selo) in Meshchovsky District of Kaluga Oblast, Russia, located  southwest of Moscow River Serena (A tributary of the Oka tributary Zhizdra).

Crossing the village is the Moscow–Kiev railway line.

The best known feature of Moshonki is the structure of the place Alexander Nevsky Church from the 18th century, which was built in the 1930s, destroyed by a fire, and recently rebuilt.

References

Rural localities in Kaluga Oblast